Callocasta is a monotypic moth genus in the family Geometridae described by Charles Swinhoe in 1894. Its only species, Callocasta similis, described by Frederic Moore in 1888, is found in Darjeeling, India.

References

Ennominae